FCM Dorohoi was a Romanian professional football club from Dorohoi, Botoșani County, Romania, founded in 2010. Home matches were played at Stadionul Municipal, the same stadium which Cristalul, former Dorohoi football team, used to play.

History
In spite they finishing 2nd in 2010–11 Liga IV Botoșani season, FCM Dorohoi qualifying for the Liga IV promotion play-off because the second team of FC Botoșani, the winner of the league, was disbanded at the end of the season. In play-off they played with the champions of Vaslui County, FCM Huși, and managed to win with 2–1 after extra time in a match that was played in Iași at the Tepro Stadium, promoting to Liga III.

They finished 8th in the 2011–12 Liga III and 2nd 2012–13 Liga III.

The club currently plays in the Liga II for the first time ever in the 2014–15 after they finished 1st in the 2013–14 Liga III.

After finishing on 7th place in their first Liga II season, the club was dissolved in the summer of 2015.

Honours
Liga III
Winners (1): 2013–14
Runners-up (1): 2012–13
Liga IV – Botoșani County
Runners-up (1): 2010–11

References

External links
 FCM Dorohoi Official website

Association football clubs established in 2010
Defunct football clubs in Romania
Football clubs in Botoșani County
Association football clubs disestablished in 2015
Liga II clubs
Liga III clubs
2010 establishments in Romania
2015 disestablishments in Romania